Is Divorce A Failure is a 1923 silent drama film written by and starring Leah Baird. Arthur Beck, Baird's husband, produced and Wallace Worsley directed. It is not known whether the film currently survives, and it may be a lost film.

Cast
Leah Baird - Carol Lockwood
Richard Tucker - David Lockwood
Walter McGrail - Kelcey Barton
Tom Santschi - Smith
Alec B. Francis - Philip Wilkinson

References

External links

 
 lantern slide

1923 films
American silent feature films
American films based on plays
Films directed by Wallace Worsley
Silent American drama films
1923 drama films
American black-and-white films
Associated Exhibitors films
1920s American films